The Milltown Cemetery attack (also known as the Milltown Cemetery killings or Milltown massacre) took place on 16 March 1988 at Milltown Cemetery in Belfast, Northern Ireland. During the large funeral of three Provisional IRA members killed in Gibraltar, an Ulster Defence Association (UDA) member, Michael Stone, attacked the mourners with hand grenades and pistols. He had learned there would be no police or armed IRA members at the cemetery. As Stone then ran towards the nearby motorway, a large crowd chased him and he continued shooting and throwing grenades. Some of the crowd caught Stone and beat him, but he was rescued by the police and arrested. Three people had been killed and more than 60 wounded. The "unprecedented, one-man attack" was filmed by television news crews and caused shock around the world.

Three days later, two British Army corporals drove into the funeral procession of one of the Milltown victims. The non-uniformed soldiers were dragged from their car by an angry crowd, beaten and then shot dead by the IRA, in what became known as the corporals killings.

Background
On 6 March 1988, Provisional IRA members Daniel McCann, Seán Savage and Mairéad Farrell were shot dead by the Special Air Service (SAS) in Gibraltar, in Operation Flavius. The three had allegedly been preparing a bomb attack on British military personnel there, but the deaths outraged republicans as the three were unarmed and shot without warning. Their bodies arrived in Belfast on 14 March and were taken to their family homes. Tensions were high as the security forces flooded the neighbourhoods where they had lived, to try to prevent public displays honouring the dead. The "Gilbraltar Three" were due to be buried in the republican plot at Milltown Cemetery on 16 March. For years, republicans had complained about heavy-handed policing of IRA funerals, which had led to violence. In a change from normal procedure, the security forces agreed to stay away from the funeral in exchange for guarantees that there would be no three-volley salute by IRA gunmen. The British Army and Royal Ulster Constabulary (RUC) would instead keep watch from the sidelines. This decision was not made public.

Michael Stone was a loyalist, a member of the Ulster Defence Association (UDA) who had been involved in several killings and other attacks, and who described himself as a "freelance loyalist paramilitary". Stone learned that there would be little security force presence at the funerals, and planned "to take out the Sinn Féin and IRA leadership at the graveside". He said his attack was retaliation for the Remembrance Day bombing four months earlier, when eleven Protestants had been killed by an IRA bomb at a Remembrance Sunday ceremony. He later told journalist Peter Taylor that "it was symbolic: the IRA had attacked a British cenotaph and he was taking revenge by attacking the IRA equivalent". Stone claimed that he and other UDA members considered planting bombs in the graveyard, but abandoned the plan because the bombs might miss the republican leaders. He instead decided to carry out a one-man attack with guns and grenades. Stone claimed that a "senior member of the UDA" had given him the organisation's official clearance for the attack and that he was given a Browning Hi-Power 9 mm pistol, a Ruger Speed-Six .357 Magnum revolver and seven RGD-5 grenades the night before the funeral.

Attack

The funeral service and requiem mass went ahead as planned, and the cortege made its way to Milltown Cemetery, off the Falls Road. Present were thousands of mourners and top members of the IRA and Sinn Féin, including Sinn Féin leader Gerry Adams and Martin McGuinness. Two RUC helicopters hovered overhead. Stone claimed that he entered the graveyard through the front gate with the mourners and mingled with the large crowd, although one witness claimed to have seen him enter from the M1 motorway with three other people. 

As the third coffin was about to be lowered into the ground, Stone threw two grenades—which had a seven-second delay—toward the republican plot and began shooting. There was panic and confusion; people took cover behind gravestones. Stone began jogging toward the motorway, several hundred yards away, chased by dozens of men and youths. He periodically stopped to shoot and throw grenades at his pursuers. In the 19 March edition of the Irish Times, columnist Kevin Myers, an opponent of republican paramilitary violence, wrote: "Unarmed young men charged against the man hurling grenades and firing an automatic pistol... The young men stalking their quarry repeatedly came under fire; they were repeatedly bombed; they repeatedly advanced. Indeed this was not simply bravery; this was a heroism which in other circumstances, I have no doubt, would have won the highest military decorations". 

Three people were killed while pursuing Stone, Catholic civilians Thomas McErlean (20) and John Murray (26) and IRA member Caoimhín Mac Brádaigh (30), also known as Kevin Brady. During the attack, about 60 people were wounded by bullets, grenade shrapnel and fragments of marble and stone from gravestones. Among those wounded was a pregnant mother of four, a 72-year-old grandmother, and a ten-year-old boy. Some fellow loyalists said that Stone made the mistake of throwing his grenades too soon; the death toll would likely have been much higher had the grenades exploded in mid-air, "raining lethal shrapnel over a wide area".

A white van that had been parked on the hard shoulder of the motorway suddenly drove off as Stone fled from the angry crowd. There was speculation that the van was part of the attack, but the RUC said it was part of a police patrol, and that the officers sped off because they feared for their lives. Stone said he had arranged for a getaway car, driven by a UDA member, to pick him up on the hard shoulder of the motorway, but the driver allegedly "panicked and left". By the time Stone reached the motorway, he had seemingly run out of ammunition. He ran out onto the road and tried to stop cars, but was caught by the crowd, beaten, and bundled into a hijacked vehicle. Armed RUC officers in Land Rovers quickly arrived, "almost certainly saving his life". They arrested him and took him to Musgrave Park Hospital for treatment of his injuries. The whole event had been recorded by television news cameras.

Aftermath

That evening, angry youths in republican districts burnt hijacked vehicles and attacked the RUC. Immediately after the attack, the two main loyalist paramilitary groups—the UDA and the Ulster Volunteer Force (UVF)—denied responsibility. The leader of the UDA West Belfast Brigade, Tommy Lyttle, said that Stone was a rogue loyalist acting without orders from the UDA, although he did not condemn the attack. Lyttle told other UDA leaders to keep to this line. UDA member Sammy Duddy said: "After Milltown, two UDA brigadiers from two Belfast battalions telephoned the IRA to say they didn't know Michael Stone... But Michael was UDA, he was a travelling gunman who went after the IRA and Republicans and he needed no authority for that because that was his job. Those two brigadiers were scared in case the IRA would retaliate against them or their areas... so they disclaimed Michael, one of our best operators".

Sinn Féin and others "claimed that there must have been collusion with the security forces, because only a small number of people knew in advance of the reduced police presence at the funerals". Stone later claimed he had assurances that British soldiers and RUC officers would not be deployed in the graveyard. He also claimed to have had detailed information about British Army and RUC movements. Stone said that, the night before the attack, he was "given his pick of weapons from an Ulster Resistance cache at a secret location outside Belfast" and was "driven back into the city by a member of the RUC". According to journalist Martin Dillon, the weapons he used were given to him on the orders of UDA intelligence chief Brian Nelson, who was later revealed to be an undercover agent of the British Army's Force Research Unit (FRU).

Three days later, during the funeral of one of Stone's victims, Caoimhín Mac Brádaigh, two British Army corporals (Derek Wood and David Howes) in civilian clothes and in a civilian car drove into the path of the funeral cortège, apparently by mistake. Many of those present believed the soldiers were loyalists intent on repeating Stone's attack. An angry crowd surrounded and attacked their car. Corporal Wood drew his service pistol and fired a shot in the air. The two men were then dragged from the car before being taken away, beaten and shot dead by the IRA. The incident is often referred to as the corporals killings and, like the attack at Milltown, much of it was filmed by television news cameras. 

The Browning pistol Stone used was seized on the day of the attack and was eventually used by an IRA unit to ambush a combined RUC–Army patrol in Belfast on 13 October 1990. A constable was shot dead and another badly injured. In March 1989, Stone was convicted for the three murders at Milltown, for three paramilitary murders before and for other offences, receiving sentences totalling 682 years. Many hardline loyalists saw him as a hero and he became a loyalist icon. After his conviction, an issue of the UDA magazine Ulster was devoted to Stone, stating that he "stood bravely in the middle of rebel scum and let them have it". Apart from time on remand spent in Crumlin Road Prison, Stone spent all of his sentence in HM Prison Maze.  Stone was released under the Good Friday Agreement after serving 13 years. Author and journalist Martin Dillon interviewed Stone in prison and published a book about him in 1992, Stone Cold: The True Story of Michael Stone and the Milltown Massacre. 

Stone later published an autobiography, None Shall Divide Us, which included an account of the attack, in which he wrote that he deeply regretted the hurt he had caused the families of those he killed and paid tribute to the bravery of two of the men killed while pursuing him at the cemetery (Murray, Mac Brádaigh). Stone wrote "I didn't choose killing as a career, killing chose me". Stone later alleged that while being held in police custody after the attack, a young RUC officer asked him to sign a copy of the RUC's in-house magazine Police Beat that had Chief Constable John Hermon's face on the cover. In November 2006, Stone was charged with attempted murder of Martin McGuinness and Gerry Adams, having been arrested attempting to enter the parliament buildings at Stormont while armed. He was subsequently convicted and sentenced to a further 16 years' imprisonment. Stone was released on parole in 2021.

See also

Timeline of Ulster Defence Association actions
List of massacres in Great Britain

References

1988 in Northern Ireland
1988 mass shootings in Europe
1988 murders in the United Kingdom
1980s in County Antrim
1980s mass shootings in the United Kingdom
Cemeteries in Northern Ireland
Deaths by firearm in Northern Ireland
Explosions in Belfast
Filmed killings
March 1988 crimes
March 1988 events in the United Kingdom
Mass shootings in Belfast
Murder in Belfast
People killed by the Ulster Defence Association
Terrorist incidents in Belfast
Terrorist incidents in the United Kingdom in 1988
1980s murders in Northern Ireland
1988 crimes in Ireland
The Troubles in Belfast
Ulster Defence Association actions